Kandappu Murugesu (மன்னவன் கந்தப்பு முருகேசு) (18 June 1926 – 15 February 2004), popularly known as Mannavan Master, was born on 18 June 1926, Karaveddy, Jaffna, Sri Lanka. He was a renowned Tamil poet and educationist. He studied under the late eminent Tamil scholar Pandithamani S. Kanapathipillai, who fondly called him "Mannavan". During his lifetime, he won several awards and accolades in poetry competitions and was well known for his eloquence and witty disposition. He is survived by his wife, Pathini, and seven children.

References

1926 births
2004 deaths
Sri Lankan Tamil literature
Sri Lankan Hindus
Sri Lankan Tamil revivalists